Stylissa caribica is a species of sponge. Stylisins 1 and 2 are antimicrobial cyclic heptapeptides which have been isolated from this species.

References 

Heteroscleromorpha
Animals described in 1998